Eleanor Spencer  may refer to:

Eleanor Patterson Spencer (1895-1992), American art historian
Eleanor Spencer (pianist) (1890–1973), American musician
Margaret Spencer or Eleanor Spencer (1472–1536)
Eleanor Beaufort, wife of Sir Robert Spencer (1431–1501)